Tana Church is a parish church of the Church of Norway in Deatnu-Tana Municipality in Troms og Finnmark county, Norway. It is located in the village of Rustefjelbma.  It is the main church for the Tana parish which is part of the Indre Finnmark prosti (deanery) in the Diocese of Nord-Hålogaland. The unique, brown, wooden church was built in a long church style in 1964 using designs drawn up by the architect Esben Poulsson (1907-1974) to replace the old church that was burned down by the retreating German forces towards the end of World War II. The church seats about 300 people.

History
The first church in Tana was built around the year 1720. In 1851, the old church was torn down and replaced with a new church on the same site. In 1892, a new church was constructed on the same site. This new building was designed by the architect Jacob Wilhelm Nordan. The church was destroyed by fire in 1944 by the retreating German army which burned most buildings in Finnmark. After the war, the church was rebuilt when funds were available. The new church was completed in 1964. The church was constructed of wood with a roof covered in tiles of quartz shale from nearby Alta. The altarpiece was painted by the artist Terje Grøstad.

See also
List of churches in Nord-Hålogaland

References

External links
Tana Church (travel finnmark)

Tana, Norway
Churches in Finnmark
Wooden churches in Norway
20th-century Church of Norway church buildings
Churches completed in 1964
1720 establishments in Norway
Long churches in Norway